La Prévière is a former commune in the Maine-et-Loire department in western France. On 15 December 2016, it was merged into the new commune Ombrée d'Anjou.

Geography
The river Verzée forms all of the commune's north-eastern border.

See also
Communes of the Maine-et-Loire department

References

Previere